Radviliškis District Municipality is one of the seven municipalities of Šiauliai County (Šiaulių apskritis) in Lithuania. Radviliškis town has been its center since 1950.

Radviliškis district has 13 subdivisions or elderships (Seniūnija).

Industry
Radviliškis is known for its soft beverages, timber processing, furniture and machinery production industries, sewn and knitted men's and ladies' wear, and the biggest second-hand car market in Northern Lithuania. The district is famous for extracting peat also.

Agriculture is developed in the district because of the high fecundity of the soil. The main agriculture branches are cattle, pigs, sheep breeding, cereal, sugar beets, meat and milk production. The production rates for meat, milk, grain, and sugar beets are among the highest in Lithuania.

Farmers also grow currants and strawberries, breed turkeys and ostriches.

Institutions
There are 50 educational institutions in Radviliškis District. There are two gymnasiums, five secondary schools, arts, music and sports schools, children's foster in Radviliškis town. Representatives of district's secondary schools develop their leadership skills at the School of Democracy and Social Practice “Ateitis”.

At the Lithuanian Rehabilitation Vocational Training center, disabled youths can get occupational training. The Center positively cooperates with foreign partners, changes places with delegations of schoolchildren, and pursues international projects.

Geography

Distances
From Radviliškis, it is:
 137 km to Kaunas
 146 km to Ryga
 180 km to Vilnius
 180 km to Klaipėda

Town twinning
Today Radviliškis is actively cooperating with foreign countries. The municipality expands international cooperation in the fields of municipal affairs, health care, social security, ecology, monument preservation, tourism, culture and education. The district is connected with:
 Sweden's Skara – since 1991.
 Germany's Speyer – since 1993.
 Poland's Grodzisk Mazowiecki – since 1995.
 Norway's Lillehammer – since 1997.
 Latvia's Valka – since 1999.
 Norway's Stathelle – since 2003.
 Estonia's Valga – since 2004.

Elderates
 Aukštelkiai elderate (capital - Aukštelkiai)
 Baisogala elderate (capital - Baisogala)
 Grinkiškis elderate (capital - Grinkiškis)
 Pakalniškiai elderate (capital - Pakalniškiai)
 Radviliškis rural elderate (capital - Radviliškis)
 Radviliškis urban elderate (consists of Radviliškis town, which is also capital)
 Šaukotas elderate (capital - Šaukotas)
 Šeduva rural elderate (capital - Šeduva)
 Šeduva urban elderate (consists of Šeduva town, which is also capital)
 Šiaulėnai elderate (capital - Šiaulėnai)
 Sidabravas elderate (capitals - Sidabravas)
 Škėmiai elderate (capital - Škėmiai)
 Tyruliai elderate

Attractions
There are many places of interest in Radviliškis district, such as:
 Wooden Sculptures' Alley in Radviliškis Town Park
 Raudondvaris
 Baisogala Manor
 The 17th century Šeduva church
 Daugyvene Cultural and History Museum, established in 1990
 The Gothic manor palace of baron Teodoras von Ropas on the bank of the Daugyvenė river in Raudondvaris. The manor was built in the beginning of the 19th century. There is large park near the palace.
 The stud and Šiauliai sport aviation base in Raudondvaris
 Gomerta Landscape Reserve
 The palace of Baisogala Manor, one of the most famous architectural monuments in Lithuania. Its magnitude and ornamentation has been amazing the visitors for 130 years. This manor was built in the 18–19th centuries. The Komaras family lived there. The palace is a monument to classicism and romanticism styles of architecture.

See also
 List of municipalities in Lithuania
 Subdivisions of Lithuania
 Counties of Lithuania

References

External links
 
 www.lietuva.lt — Radviliskis Region
 www.randburg.com — Radviliskis Region
 www.vilniusconsult.lt — Feasibility and EIA study for Radviliskis WWTP

 
Municipalities of Šiauliai County
Municipalities of Lithuania